Kazeem Bolaji (born 13 December 2002) is a Nigerian professional footballer who plays as a left back for FC Spartak Trnava.

Club career

FC Spartak Trnava
Bolaji became FC Spartak Trnava player in February 2022, signing a three-and-a-half-year contract.

Bolaji made his professional Fortuna Liga debut for Spartak Trnava against MFK Ružomberok on 20 March 2022, playing entire match.

References

External links
 FC Spartak Trnava official club profile 
 
 Fortuna Liga Profile 
 Futbalnet Profile 

2002 births
Living people
Nigerian footballers
Nigerian expatriate footballers
Association football defenders
FC Spartak Trnava players
Slovak Super Liga players
3. Liga (Slovakia) players
Expatriate footballers in Estonia
Nigerian expatriate sportspeople in Estonia
Expatriate footballers in Slovakia
Nigerian expatriate sportspeople in Slovakia